Hôtel de Guénégaud may refer to one of several 17th-century hôtels particuliers (large townhouses) in Paris:
 Hôtel de Guénégaud (rue des Archives), completed in 1655
 Hôtel de Guénégaud, the name of the Hôtel de Nevers (left bank) from 1646 to 1670
 Hôtel de Guénégaud, another name of Salle de la Bouteille or Guénégaud Theatre
 Hôtel de Guénégaud or Hôtel du Plessis-Guénégaud, located on the Quai Malaquais and known by these names from 1670 to 1680